Timothy Winston Liljegren (born 30 April 1999) is a Swedish professional ice hockey defenceman. He is currently playing with the  Toronto Maple Leafs of the National Hockey League (NHL).

Playing career

Swedish Hockey League
Liljegren made his Swedish Hockey League debut on 3 December 2015 playing with Rögle BK during the 2015–16 SHL season. Liljegren missed the first two months of the 2016–17 season after getting mononucleosis.

National Hockey League

On 23 June 2017, Liljegren was selected in the first-round, 17th overall, by the Toronto Maple Leafs in the 2017 NHL Entry Draft. He later agreed with the Maple Leafs to a three-year, entry-level contract on 12 July 2017. Liljegren was assigned to the Maple Leafs' American Hockey League (AHL) affiliate, the Toronto Marlies, for their 2017–18 season. In his rookie season, he was the youngest defenceman in the AHL. That same season, the Marlies beat the Texas Stars to win the Calder Cup.

Liljegren made his NHL debut with the Maple Leafs on 18 January 2020 in a 6–2 defeat against the Chicago Blackhawks. He earned his first NHL point in his sixth NHL game; an assist in a 4–2 victory over the Ottawa Senators.

Liljegren scored his first National Hockey League goal on 15 January 2022 against Jordan Binnington of the St. Louis Blues.

On 27 June 2022, Liljegren signed a two-year $2.8 million contract with the Maple Leafs. He missed the beginning of the 2022–23 season with a hernia. He played his first game of the season on 5 November against the Boston Bruins.

Personal life
Liljegren was born and grew up in Kristianstad. He and his two older brothers were raised by a single mother. At age 14, his family moved to Ängelholm, home of the Rögle BK hockey program, to further his hockey career.

Liljegren holds American citizenship through his father, who is from New Jersey.

Career statistics

Regular season and playoffs

International

Awards and honors

References

External links
 

1999 births
Living people
Swedish people of American descent
National Hockey League first-round draft picks
Newfoundland Growlers players
People from Kristianstad Municipality
People from Ängelholm Municipality
Rögle BK players
Swedish ice hockey defencemen
Toronto Maple Leafs draft picks
Toronto Maple Leafs players
Toronto Marlies players
Sportspeople from Skåne County